Lagusia micracanthus is a species of fish from the grunter family, Terapontidae, and the only member of the genus Lagusia. It is endemic to rivers, both large and small, in South Sulawesi, Indonesia.

Appearance and behavior 
Adults are silver-grey with horizontal dark stripes and yellowish fins. Females as small as  have carried eggs, showing that it reach maturity at a smaller size than all other grunters. It is typically found in groups. Little is known about its feeding behavior, but one specimens had a stomach filled with insect larvae.

References 

Monotypic Perciformes genera
Terapontidae
Fish described in 1860